Leucobryum glaucum, commonly known as leucobryum moss or pin cushion moss, is a species of haplolepideous mosses (Dicranidae) with a wide distribution in eastern North America and Europe.

External links 
Illinois Wildflowers - Leucobryum glaucum

References 

Dicranales